Cryptista is a clade of algae-like eukaryotes.  It is most likely related to Archaeplastida which includes plants and many algae, within the larger group Diaphoretickes.

Although it has sometimes placed along with Haptista in the group Hacrobia, within the kingdom Chromista, most recent studies have found that Hacrobia is not a clade.  For example, in 2016, a broad phylogenomic study found that cryptists fall within the group Archaeplastida, while haptophytes are closely related to the SAR supergroup.

Taxonomy
Based on studies done by Cavalier-Smith, Chao & Lewis 2015
Corbihelia
 Phylum Microheliellida Tedersoo 2017 [Endohelia Cavalier-Smith 2015]
 Class Endohelea Cavalier-Smith 2012
 Clade Cryptista s.s.
 Phylum Palpitophyta Tedersoo 2017
 Class Palpitea Cavalier-Smith 2012
 Clade Rollomonadia Cavalier-Smith 2013 stat. nov.
 Phylum Kathablepharidophyta Okamoto & Inouye 2005 [Leucocrypta Cavalier-Smith 2015]
 Class Leucocryptea Cavalier-Smith 2004 [Kathablepharidea (sic) Okamoto & Inouye 2005; Kathablepharidophyceae]
 Phylum Cryptophyta Pascher 1913 em. Adl et al. 2012 (Cryptomonada Cavalier-Smith 2004 sta. n.]
 Class Goniomonadea Cavalier-Smith 1993
 Class Cryptophyceae Fritsch 1937

References

External links

 Tree of Life: Hacrobia

 
Infrakingdoms
Taxa named by Thomas Cavalier-Smith